This is a list of opioids, opioid antagonists and inverse agonists.

Opium and poppy straw derivatives

Crude opiate extracts  whole opium products 

B&O Supprettes
Diascordium
Dover's powder
Kendal Black Drop
Laudanum
Mithridate
Opium
Polish heroin (Compote, Kompot)
Paregoric
Poppy straw concentrate
Poppy tea
Smoking opium
Theriac

Natural opiates

Opium alkaloids 

Codeine
Morphine
Oripavine
Pseudomorphine
Thebaine

Alkaloid salts mixtures 

Pantopon
Papaveretum (Omnopon)
Tetrapon

Semisynthetics including Bentley compounds

Morphine family 

14-Hydroxymorphine 
2,4-Dinitrophenylmorphine
6-Methyldihydromorphine 
6-Methylenedihydrodesoxymorphine
6-Acetyldihydromorphine 
Azidomorphine
Chlornaltrexamine
Chloroxymorphamine 
Desomorphine (dihydrodesoxymorphine)
Dihydromorphine
Ethyldihydromorphine 
Hydromorphinol
Methyldesorphine
Morphine methylbromide
N-Phenethylnordesomorphine
N-Phenethyl-14-ethoxymetopon
N-Phenethylnormorphine
6-Nicotinoyldihydromorphine (metabolite of nicodicodeine)
RAM-378
Ro-1539

3,6-diesters of morphine 

Acetylpropionylmorphine
3,6-Dibutanoylmorphine
Diacetyldihydromorphine (dihydroheroin, acetylmorphinol)
Dibutyrylmorphine 
Dibenzoylmorphine (first designer drug)
Diformylmorphine 
Dipropanoylmorphine
Heroin (diacetylmorphine)
Nicomorphine

Codeine-dionine family 

6-Monoacetylcodeine
Benzylmorphine
Codeine methylbromide
Desocodeine  
Dimethylmorphine (6-O-Methylcodeine) 
Ethyldihydromorphine  
Methyldihydromorphine (dihydroheterocodeine)
Ethylmorphine (dionine)
Heterocodeine
Isocodeine 
Pholcodine (morpholinylethylmorphine)
Myrophine
Thebacon
Transisocodeine

Morphinones and morphols 

14-Cinnamoyloxycodeinone
14-Ethoxymetopon
14-Methoxymetopon
14-Phenylpropoxymetopon
3-Acetyloxymorphone
3,14-Diacetyloxymorphone
7-Spiroindanyloxymorphone
8,14-Dihydroxydihydromorphinone 
Acetylcodone 
Acetylmorphone
α-hydrocodol  (=dihydrocodeine)
Benzhydrocodone
Bromoisopropropyldihydromorphinone cas?
Codeinone
Codoxime
Conorfone (codorphone)
IBNtxA
Thebacon (acetyldihydrocodeinone, dihydrocodeinone enol acetate)
Hydrocodone
Hydromorphone
Hydroxycodeine 
Metopon (=methyldihydromorphinone)
Morphenol 
Morphinone
Morphol 
N-Phenethyl-14-ethoxymetopon
Noroxymorphone
Oxycodone
Oxymorphol
Oxymorphone
Pentamorphone
Semorphone

Morphides 

α-Chlorocodide (= chlorocodide) 
β-Chlorocodide 
α-Chloromorphide (= chloromorphide)
Bromocodide 
Bromomorphide 
Chlorodihydrocodide 
Chloromorphide
Codide

Dihydrocodeine series 

14-Hydroxydihydrocodeine
Acetyldihydrocodeine
Dihydrocodeine
Dihydrodesoxycodeine (desocodeine) 
Dihydroisocodeine 
Nicocodeine
Nicodicodeine

Nitrogen morphine derivatives 

1-Nitrocodeine cas? 
Codeine-N-oxide 
Morphine-N-oxide

Hydrazones 

Oxymorphazone

Halogenated morphine derivatives 

1-Bromocodeine 
1-Chlorocodeine 
1-Iodomorphine

Active opiate metabolites 

Codeine-6-glucuronide 
Codeine-N-oxide (genocodeine)
Heroin-7,8-oxide 
Morphine-6-glucuronide
3-Monoacetylmorphine
6-Monoacetylmorphine
Morphine-N-oxide (genomorphine)
Naltrexol 
Norcodeine 
Normorphine

Morphinans

Morphinan series 

 3-Hydroxymorphinan 
 4-Chlorophenylpyridomorphinan 
 Cyclorphan
 Levargorphan 
 Levorphanol
 Levophenacylmorphan
 Levomethorphan
 Methorphan (racemethorphan)
 Morphanol (racemorphanol)
 Norlevorphanol
 N-Methylmorphinan 
 Oxilorphan
 Phenomorphan
 Proxorphan
 Ro4-1539
 Stephodeline  Xorphanol

Others 

 1-Nitroaknadinine * 14-episinomenine 
 5,6-Dihydronorsalutaridine 
 6-Keto Nalbuphine 
 Aknadinine 
 Butorphanol
 Cephakicine 
 Cephasamine 
 Cyprodime
 Drotebanol
 Fenfangjine G 
 Ketorfanol
 Nalbuphine
 Nalbuphone
 Tannagine

Benzomorphans 

 5,9 alpha-diethyl-2-hydroxybenzomorphan (5,9-DEHB) 
 8-Carboxamidocyclazocine (8-CAC)
 Alazocine
 Anazocine 
 Bremazocine
 Butinazocine 
 Carbazocine 
 Cogazocine
 Cyclazocine
 Dezocine
 Eptazocine
 Etazocine  
 Ethylketazocine 
 Fedotozine  
 Fluorophen 
 Gemazocine  
 Ibazocine  
 Ketazocine
 Metazocine
 Moxazocine  
 Pentazocine
 Phenazocine
 Quadazocine 
 SKF-10047
 Thiazocine 
 Tonazocine
 Volazocine
 Zenazocine

4-Phenylpiperidines

Pethidines (meperidines) 

 4-Fluoropethidine
 Allylnorpethidine
 Anileridine
 Benzethidine
 Carperidine
 Difenoxin
 Diphenoxylate
 Etoxeridine (carbetidine)
 Furethidine
 Hydroxypethidine (bemidone)
 Morpheridine
 Meperidine-N-oxide 
 Oxpheneridine (carbamethidine)
 Pethidine (meperidine)
 Pethidine intermediate A
 Pethidine intermediate B (norpethidine)
 Pethidine intermediate C (pethidinic acid)
 Pheneridine
 Phenoperidine
 Piminodine
 Properidine (ipropethidine)
 Sameridine

Prodines 

 Allylprodine
 (α/β)-Meprodine
 Desmethylprodine (MPPP)
 PEPAP
 (α/β)-Prodine
 Prosidol
 Trimeperidine (promedol)

Ketobemidones 

 Acetoxyketobemidone
 Droxypropine
 Ketobemidone
 Methylketobemidone
 Propylketobemidone

Others 

 Alvimopan
 Loperamide
 LS-115509
 Picenadol

Open chain opioids

Amidones 

 Dextromethadone 
 Dipipanone
 Isomethadone 
 Levoisomethadone 
 Levomethadone 
 Methadone
 Methadone intermediate 
 Normethadone
 Norpipanone 
 Phenadoxone (heptazone)

Methadols 

 Acetylmethadol 
 Alphaacetylmethadol 
 Alphamethadol 
Betacetylmethadol 
Betamethadol 
Dimepheptanol (racemethadol)
 Isomethadol 
Levacetylmethadol
 Noracymethadol

Moramides 

 Desmethylmoramide 
 Dextromoramide
 Levomoramide
 Moramide intermediate  
 Racemoramide

Thiambutenes 

 Diethylthiambutene
 Dimethylthiambutene
 Ethylmethylthiambutene
 Piperidylthiambutene
 Pyrrolidinylthiambutene
 Thiambutene

Phenalkoxams 

 Dextropropoxyphene (propoxyphene)
 Dimenoxadol
 Dioxaphetyl butyrate
 Levopropoxyphene
 Norpropoxyphene
 Pyrroliphene

Ampromides 

 Diampromide
 Phenampromide
 Propiram

Others 

 Embutramide
 IC-26
 Isoaminile
 Lefetamine
 R-4066

Anilidopiperidines 

 3-Allylfentanyl
 3-Methylfentanyl
 3-Methylthiofentanyl
 4-Phenylfentanyl
 Alfentanil
 α-Methylacetylfentanyl
 α-Methylfentanyl
 α-Methylthiofentanyl
 Benzylfentanyl   
 β-hydroxyfentanyl
 β-hydroxythiofentanyl
 β-Methylfentanyl
 Brifentanil
 Butyrfentanyl
 Carfentanil
 Fentanyl
 Lofentanil
 N-Methylcarfentanil
 Mirfentanil
 Ocfentanil
 Ohmefentanyl
 Parafluorofentanyl
 Phenaridine
 R-30490
 Remifentanil
 Sufentanil
 Thenylfentanyl 
 
 Thiofentanyl
 Trefentanil

Oripavine derivatives 

 7-PET
 Acetorphine
 Alletorphine (N-allyl-noretorphine)
 BU-48
 Buprenorphine
 Buprenorphine-3-glucuronide
 Cyprenorphine
 Dihydroetorphine
 Etorphine
 Homprenorphine
 18,19-Dehydrobuprenorphine (HS-599)  
 N-cyclopropylmethylnoretorphine 
 Nepenthone   
 Norbuprenorphine
 Norbuprenorphine-3-glucuronide
 Thevinone  
 Thienorphine

Phenazepanes 

 Ethoheptazine
 Meptazinol
 Metheptazine
 Metethoheptazine
 Proheptazine

Pirinitramides 

 Bezitramide
 Piritramide

Benzimidazoles 

 Clonitazene
 Etonitazene
 Isotonitazene
 Metonitazene

Indoles 

 18-Methoxycoronaridine
 7-Acetoxymitragynine 
 7-Hydroxymitragynine
 ψ-Akuammigine
 Akuammidine 
 Akuammine
 Coronaridine
 Eseroline
 Hodgkinsine
 Ibogaine
 Mitragynine
 Mitragynine pseudoindoxyl
 Noribogaine
 Pericine
 Pseudoakuammigine

Beta-Amino Ketones 

 3-(dimethylamino)-2,2-dimethyl-1-phenylpropan-1-one

Diphenylmethylpiperazines 

 BW373U86
 DPI-221
 DPI-287
 DPI-3290
 SNC-80
 AZD-2327

Opioid peptides

Dynorphins 

 Big dynorphin
 Dynorphin A
 Dynorphin B
 Leumorphin

Endomorphins 

 Endomorphin-1
 Endomorphin-2

Endorphins 

 α-Endorphin
 β-Endorphin
 γ-Endorphin
 α-Neoendorphin
 β-Neoendorphin

Enkephalins 

 DADLE
 DAMGO
 Deltorphin 
 Met-enkephalin
 Leu-enkephalin

Propeptides 

 Proenkephalin
 Proendorphin
 Proopiomelanocortin

Others / unknown 

 Adrenorphin
 Amidorphin
 Biphalin
 Casokefamide
 Casomorphins
 Cytochrophin-4
 DALDA (Tyr-D-Arg-Phe-Lys-NH2) 
 Deltorphin I
 Deltorphin II
 Deprolorphin
 Dermorphin
 DPDPE 
 Frakefamide
 Gliadorphin
 Gluten exorphins
 Hemorphin-4
 Metkefamide
 Morphiceptin
 Nociceptin
 Octreotide
 Opiorphin
 Rubiscolin
 Soymorphins
 Spinorphin
 TRIMU 5
 Tynorphin
 Valorphin
 Zyklophin

Others 

 3-(3-Methoxyphenyl)-3-ethoxycarbonyltropane  
 AD-1211
 AH-7921
 Axomadol
 Azaprocin
 BDPC
 Bisnortilidine      
 BRL-52537
 Bromadol
 Bromadoline
 Ciprefadol
 Ciramadol
 Doxpicomine
 Enadoline
 Faxeladol
 GR-89696
 Herkinorin
 ICI-199,441
 ICI-204,448
 Ketamine
 KNT-42
 LPK-26
 Lufuradom
 Metofoline
 MT-45
 Desmethylclozapine
 Nexeridine
 NNC 63-0532
 Nortilidine
 O-Desmethyltramadol
 Phenadone
 Phencyclidine
 Prodilidine
 Profadol
 Ro64-6198
 Salvinorin A
 Salvinorin B ethoxymethyl ether
 Salvinorin B methoxymethyl ether
 SB-612,111
 SC-17599
 RWJ-394,674
 TAN-67
 Tapentadol
 Thiobromadol (C-8813)
 Tifluadom
 Tilidine
 Tramadol
 Trimebutine
 U-47700
 U-50,488
 U-69,593
 Viminol
 1-(4-Nitrophenylethyl)piperidylidene-2-(4-chlorophenyl)sulfonamide (W-18)

Opioid antagonists and inverse agonists 

 4-Caffeoyl-1,5-quinide
 5'-Guanidinonaltrindole
 β-Funaltrexamine
 6β-Naltrexol
 6β-Naltrexol-d4
 Alvimopan
 AT-076
 Binaltorphimine
 BU09059
 Buprenorphine
 Chlornaltrexamine
 Clocinnamox
 Cyclazocine
 Cyprodime
 Diacetylnalorphine  
 Diprenorphine (M5050)
 Fedotozine
 ICI-174864
 J-113,397
 JDTic
 JTC-801
 Levallorphan
 LY-2456302
 LY-255582
 Methocinnamox
 Methylnaltrexone
 ML350
 Naldemedine
 Nalfurafine
 Nalmefene
 Nalmexone  
 Nalodeine (N-allylnorcodeine) 
 Naloxazone
 Naloxegol
 Naloxol
 Naloxonazine
 Naloxone
 Naloxone benzoylhydrazone
 Nalorphine
 Naltrexone
 Naltriben
 Naltrindole
 Norbinaltorphimine
 Oxilorphan
 PF-4455242
 S-allyl-3-hydroxy-17-thioniamorphinan (SAHTM)
 Samidorphan 
SR-16430

Biased ligands 

 6'-Guanidinonaltrindole
 7-Hydroxymitragynine
 Herkinorin
 ICI-199,441
 Noribogaine
 Oliceridine
 RB-64
 TRV734

Receptor heteromer targeting ligands 

 6'-GNTI (δ-κ)
 CYM-51010 (δ-μ)
 NNTA (κ-μ)
 IBNtxA (μ1G-NOP)

Uncategorized opioids 

 ADL-5859
 Alimadol
 Amentoflavone
 Anilopam   +HCl 
 Asimadoline
 Cyproterone acetate
 FE 200665
 Fedotozine
 HZ-2
 Kolokol-1
 Matrine
 MCOPPB
 Menthol
 MT-7716
 Nalfurafine
 Nalorphine
 Nalorphine dinicotinate
 PZM21
 Proglumide
 Ro65-6570 
SoRI-9409 
Spiradoline 
SR-8993 
SR-16435

Combination drug formulations containing opioids 

 Buprenorphine/naloxone
 Buprenorphine/samidorphan (ALKS-5461)
 Co-codamol (codeine phosphate/paracetamol)
 Co-codaprin (codeine phosphate/aspirin)
 Co-dydramol (dihydrocodeine tartrate/paracetamol)
 Co-proxamol (dextropropoxyphene/paracetamol)
 Fentanyl/fluanisone
 Hydrocodone/ibuprofen
 Hydrocodone/paracetamol
 Loperamide/simethicone
 Morphine/naltrexone
 Naltrexone/bupropion
 Oxycodone/aspirin
 Oxycodone/naloxone
 Oxycodone/paracetamol

See also 
 List of opioids by visual 2D molecular skeletal renderings (bundled remotely, click "show" after following link)
 List of Schedule I drugs (US)
 Gray death

References

External links 
 Carbonate derivatives of 14β-hydroxycodeine "viz., 14β-hydroxy-6-O-(methoxycarbonyl)codeine, 6-O-methoxycarbonyl-14β-(methoxycarbonyloxy)codeine, and 14β-acetoxy-6-O-methoxy-carbonylcodeine, potential substrates for ring C modification in morphinane (sic) alkaloids, were synthesized for the first time." Russian Chemical Bulletin. August 2008, Volume 57, Issue 8, pp 1773–1774. Date: 11 Aug 2009; I. V. Evsikova, S. K. Moiseev, P. V. Petrovskii, V. N. Kalinin. Published in Russian in Izvestiya Akademii Nauk. Seriya Khimicheskaya, No. 8, pp. 1739–1740

List
Opioids